East Finchley Cemetery is a cemetery and crematorium in East End Road, East Finchley. Although it is in the London Borough of Barnet, it is owned and managed by the City of Westminster.

History and characteristics
The St Marylebone Burial Board purchased  of Newmarket Farm in 1854; and the cemetery, then known as St Marylebone Cemetery, was laid out by architects Barnett & Birch after winning a competition.

Principal features are two Lebanon Cedar trees planted on the front lawn. The crematorium was opened in 1937.

Due to local government reorganisation, the cemetery was managed by the Metropolitan Borough of St Marylebone – from 1900; and became the responsibility of the City of Westminster in 1965, when the cemetery became known by its current name. The cemetery contains about 22,000 interments, and remains open for burials.

The cemetery became a point of controversy in the early nineties when the then Leader of Westminster City Council and one of the councillors wanted the cemetery to be sold (to avoid the substantial upkeep). The cemetery also included a considerable amount of land being used at the time for plant propagation for horticultural use throughout the City of Westminster; it also provided housing for the Cemetery Keeper. After much argument at Council Meetings and against the advice of the Chief Officers concerned, the cemetery was sold, the transaction then became part of the Westminster cemeteries scandal. The council was forced, after the move had been declared unlawful, to repurchase the cemetery but was unable to buy back the crematorium.

The cemetery contains a number of structures listed on the National Heritage List for England.

The Anglican chapel was designed by Barnett and Birch and is a Grade II listed chapel, as is the crematorium.
The gates and lodge are also Grade II listed.

The monuments to Thomas Skarratt Hall (supposedly based on the Sarcophagus of Lucius Cornelius Scipio Barbatus, it originally had 4 bronze angels, which were stolen in 1989), Harry Ripley (by William Reid Dick), Peter Nicol Russell, Thomas Tate (by Frank Lynn Jenkins), and the mausoleum (by Arthur Blomfield) of Algernon Borthwick, 1st Baron Glenesk and his wife and son, are all listed Grade II,

The cemetery was awarded a Green Flag Award in 2007, 2008 and 2009. It is also a Site of Local Importance for Nature Conservation.

Notable burials
 Melanie Appleby – Mel in pop duo Mel and Kim
 George Barham – founder of the Express County Milk Company
 Henry Walter Bates – Naturalist and explorer who gave the first scientific account of mimicry in animals
 Jeremy Beadle – TV presenter (cremated here, buried in Highgate Cemetery)
 Sir Henry Bishop – Professor of Music at Oxford and operatic composer
 Keith Blakelock – Police Constable murdered in Tottenham riot
 Algernon Borthwick, 1st Baron Glenesk – Memorial chapel and Mausoleum
 Sir James Boyton, British estate agent and a Conservative politician.
 Sir Austen Chamberlain – Foreign Secretary, recipient of Nobel Peace Prize, son of Joseph Chamberlain and brother of Neville Chamberlain
 Harry Champion – Music Hall Singer
 Robert Donat – Actor (cremated).
 Matthew Garber – Actor (cremated).
 Sir Edmund Gosse – English poet, author and critic.
 William Gowland – Engineer and archaeologist who for many years lived in Japan
 Thomas Skarratt Hall – foundation investor in the Mount Morgan mine, Queensland, Australia
 Manya Harari – translator of Russian literature and the co-founder of Harvill Press.

 Alfred Harmsworth, 1st Viscount Northcliffe – Founder of the Daily Mail
 Cecil Harmsworth, 1st Baron Harmsworth – British businessman and Liberal politician
 Sir Leicester Harmsworth – Newspaper Publisher with a memorial by Edwin Lutyens
 Harold Harrison – England rugby union international, died serving as army Colonel in World War II.
 Sir George Hayter – Queen Victoria's principal painter in ordinary
 Max Herrmann-Neisse – exiled German poet and novelist
 Quintin Hogg (merchant) – English merchant and philanthropist, remembered primarily as a benefactor of the Royal Polytechnic institution at Regent Street, London, now the University of Westminster (previously cremated).
 Fanny Houston –  British philanthropist, political activist and suffragette.
 Thomas Henry Huxley – Scientist
 Toto Koopman – Model and Italian Resistance spy
 Humphrey Lyttelton – English jazz musician and broadcaster (cremated)
 Jimmy Nervo – entertainer and part of the original Crazy Gang 
 Sir James Paget – English surgeon and pathologist after whom Paget's disease is named
 Sidney Paget – Illustrator of Arthur Conan Doyle's Sherlock Holmes stories
 Wendy Richard – Actress, previously cremated at Golders Green Crematorium
 W. Heath Robinson – Artist and cartoonist
 Gaynor Rowlands – Actress and Singer
 Sir Thomas Smith, 1st Baronet, of Stratford Place – eminent British surgeon, Surgeon Extraordinary to Queen Victoria and honorary Serjeant-Surgeon to Edward VII
 Henry Charles Stephens – Ink magnate, philanthropist and local MP
 Thomas Stevens – Cyclist, the first one to circle the globe by bicycle
 Marie Studholme – Actress and Singer
 Leopold Stokowski – Conductor
 William Bernhardt Tegetmeier – English naturalist, bee keeper and friend of Charles Darwin
 Little Tich – Music Hall singer and dancer.
 Mathilde Verne – English pianist and teacher (HM the Queen Mother)
 George Walters – Sergeant in the 49th Foot who won the Victoria Cross at the Battle of Inkermann in 1854
 Kenneth Williams – Actor and comedian (cremated).
 Albert Yorke, 6th Earl of Hardwicke – British diplomat and Conservative politician.
 Charles Yorke, 5th Earl of Hardwicke – Champagne Charlie – British aristocrat and Conservative politician

War graves
There are 75 Commonwealth service war burials of World War I in the cemetery, most in the War Graves plot in the cemetery's northwest corner that was set aside for military burials in 1916, and 79 of World War II (including two unidentified British soldiers), besides ten 'Non War graves' that the Commonwealth War Graves Commission maintains. A Screen Wall memorial, behind the Cross of Sacrifice, records the names of the 20 World War II casualties who were cremated at the St Marylebone Crematorium. There are also special memorials to eight World War I servicemen whose graves could not be marked by headstones.

Transport
The cemetery is situated near the North Circular Road (A406) en lies between East Finchley and Finchley Central stations, both on the Northern Line.

See also
 Nature reserves in Barnet
 St Pancras and Islington Cemetery
 Westminster cemeteries scandal

Gallery

References

External links

 
 War Graves (Commonwealth War Graves Commission)

1855 establishments in England
Anglican cemeteries in the United Kingdom
Cemeteries in London
Commonwealth War Graves Commission cemeteries in England
Finchley
Nature reserves in the London Borough of Barnet
Parks and open spaces in the London Borough of Barnet
Religion in the London Borough of Barnet